Stephen Sondheim was an American composer and lyricist whose most famous work includes A Funny Thing Happened on the Way to the Forum (1962), Company (1970), Follies (1971), A Little Night Music (1973), Sweeney Todd: The Demon Barber of Fleet Street (1979), Sunday in the Park with George (1984), and Into the Woods (1987). He is also known for writing the lyrics for West Side Story (1957) and Gypsy (1959).

Major works

Revues and anthologies

Side by Side by Sondheim (1976), Marry Me a Little (1980), Putting It Together (1993), and Sondheim on Sondheim (2010) are revues of Sondheim's work as composer and lyricist, with songs performed in or cut from productions. Jerome Robbins' Broadway features "You Gotta Have a Gimmick" from Gypsy, "Suite of Dances" from West Side Story and "Comedy Tonight" from A Funny Thing Happened on the Way to the Forum. The 2010 revue Classic Moments, Hidden Treasures was conceived and directed by Tim McArthur, first produced at the Jermyn Street Theatre. Sondheim's "Pretty Women" and "Everybody Ought to Have a Maid" are featured in The Madwoman of Central Park West.

Film and TV adaptations

Other works

Theatre

Film and television

Books 
Sondheim's 2010 Finishing the Hat annotates his lyrics "from productions dating 1954–1981. In addition to published and unpublished lyrics from West Side Story, Follies and Company, the tome finds Sondheim discussing his relationship with Oscar Hammerstein II and his collaborations with composers, actors and directors throughout his lengthy career". The book, first of a two-part series, is named after a song from Sunday in the Park With George. Sondheim said, "It's going to be long. I'm not, by nature, a prose writer, but I'm literate, and I have a couple of people who are vetting it for me, whom I trust, who are excellent prose writers". Finishing the Hat was published in October 2010. According to a New York Times review, "The lyrics under consideration here, written during a 27-year period, aren't presented as fixed and sacred paradigms, carefully removed from tissue paper for our reverent inspection. They're living, evolving, flawed organisms, still being shaped and poked and talked to by the man who created them". The book was 11th on the New York Times Hardcover Nonfiction list for November 5, 2010.

Its sequel, Look, I Made a Hat: Collected Lyrics (1981–2011) with Attendant Comments, Amplifications, Dogmas, Harangues, Digressions, Anecdotes and Miscellany, was published on November 22, 2011. The book, continuing from Sunday in the Park With George (where Finishing the Hat ended), includes sections on Sondheim's work in film and television.

After conducting a series of in-depth interviews with Sondheim focusing on his music, musicologist and Library of Congress curator Mark Eden Horowitz compiled them into a book entitled Sondheim on Music: Minor Details and Major Decisions, which was published in 2003.

References 

 
Lists of compositions by composer
Musicals by Stephen Sondheim